is a town located in Fukushima Prefecture, Japan. ,  the town had an estimated population of 8843 and a population density of 250 persons per km².

Geography
Kunimi is located in Date District in the very northern portion Fukushima prefecture, bordering on Miyagi prefecture.  Mt. Handa and Mt. Ugasu are near the western end of the town, and a continuous mountain range runs along the northern end of the town, which is also the prefectural border with Miyagi Prefecture. The Abukuma River flows south of the town. The town center, where government offices and various types of transportation are concentrated, is relatively close to the border with the neighboring Koori town.

Mountains: Atsukashiyama (289.4m)
Rivers: Abukuma River

Neighboring municipalities
 Fukushima Prefecture
 Date
 Koori
Miyagi Prefecture
 Shiroishi

Climate
Kunimi has a humid climate (Köppen climate classification Cfa).

Demographics
Per Japanese census data, the population of Kunimi has been in decline over the past 70 years.

History
The area of present-day Kunimi was part of ancient Mutsu Province. During the Edo period, it was partly tenryō territory under direct control of the Tokugawa shogunate, and partly under Morioka Domain. The town of Fujita developed as a post station on the Ōshū Kaidō highway.  After the Meiji Restoration, it was organized as part of Nakadōri region of Iwaki Province, and Fujita was established as a town on April 1, 1889 with the creation of the modern municipalities system. The town of Kunimi was formed on March 31, 1954 with the merger of the town of Fujita with the villages of Kosaka, Morieno, Okido, and Oeda, all in Date District. The town hall was destroyed in the 2011 Tōhoku earthquake.

Economy
The economy of Kunimi is primarily agricultural.

Education
Kunimi has one public elementary school and one public junior high school operated by the town government. The town does not have a public high school.
 Kunimi Prefectural Middle School
 Kunimi Elementary School

Transportation

Railway
JR East –  Tōhoku Main Line 
 –

Highway
  – Kunimi Interchange – Kunimi Service Area

Local attractions
Atsukashiyama Barrier, a National Historic Site
Ishimotai Memorial Stele, a National Historic Site
Ishimotai Castle ruins
Kangetsudai Cultural Center

References

External links

 

 
Towns in Fukushima Prefecture